Parmod Kumar Vij is an Indian politician. He was elected to the Haryana Legislative Assembly from Panipat City in the 2019 Haryana Legislative Assembly election as a member of the Bharatiya Janata Party.

References 

1955 births
Living people
Bharatiya Janata Party politicians from Haryana
People from Panipat
Haryana MLAs 2019–2024